Judo at the 2005 Southeast Asian Games took place in the Mandaue Coliseum, Mandaue City, Cebu, Philippines. The participants competed for 16 gold medals with eight different weight categories in both the men's and women's competitions.

Gold and silver medals in each weight class were determined by a single-elimination bracket. There was a repechage for those who are eliminated by one of the eventual semifinalists. Since there are four semifinalists, this means that four of the losers of the round of 32 (i.e., 25%) faced four of the losers from the round of 16 (50%). The winners of these matches faced the four judokas who have lost in the quarterfinals. The winners, then, of these four matches faced each other to narrow the repechage field down to two judokas. Until this stage, the repechage has been segregated into two distinct halves, with each successive competitor facing another one from the same half of the original bracket; but each of the two judokas who emerge from the repechage challenged the loser of the other bracket's semifinal. (Since these two always come from opposite halves of the original bracket, they could not have faced each other already.) The winners of these two matches were each awarded a bronze medal, making judo unusual among Olympic events in not determining a single third-place finisher.

Medal table

Medalists

Women

External links
Southeast Asian Games Official Results
 Dawa grabs RP first judo gold. December 2, 2005
 Judo doles out two more golds. December 4, 2005
 RP barely misses judo title. Philippine Star. December 5, 2005
 Myanmar bags 2 more gold, 5 silver, 10 bronze. New Light of Myanmar. 3 December 2005. Accessed 21 January 2020.
 Myanmar bag four more gold. New Light of Myanmar. 5 December 2005. Accessed 21 January 2020.

2005 Southeast Asian Games events
2005
Asian Games, Southeast
2005 Asian Games, Southeast